was a general in the Imperial Japanese Army in World War II. He and Itagaki Seishirō were the men primarily responsible for the Mukden Incident that took place in Manchuria in 1931.

Early life
Ishiwara was born in Tsuruoka City, Yamagata Prefecture, into a samurai class family. His father was a police officer, but as his clan had supported the Tokugawa bakufu and then the Northern Alliance during the Boshin War of the Meiji Restoration, its members were shut out of higher government positions.

At 13, Ishiwara was enrolled in a military preparatory school. He was subsequently accepted at the 21st class of the Imperial Japanese Army Academy and graduated in 1909. He served in the IJA 65th Infantry Regiment in Korea after its annexation by Japan in 1910, and in 1915, he passed the exams for admittance to the 30th class of the Army Staff College. He graduated second in his class in 1918.

Ishiwara spent several years in various staff assignments and then was selected to study in Germany as a military attaché. He stayed in Berlin and in Munich from 1922 to 1925, focusing on military history and military strategy. He hired several former officers from the German General Staff to tutor him, and by the time that he returned to Japan, he had formed a considerable background on military theory and doctrine.

Prior to leaving for Germany, Ishiwara had converted to Nichiren Buddhism. Nichiren had taught that a period of massive conflict would precede a golden era of human culture in which the truth of Buddhism would prevail. Japan would be the center and main promulgator of the faith, which would encompass the entire world. Ishiwara felt that the period of world conflict was fast approaching, and Japan, relying upon its vision of the kokutai and its sacred mission to "liberate" China, would lead a unified East Asia to defeat the West.

Ishiwara was also the leader of a semi-religious and Pan-Asianist organization, the East-Asia League Movement (Tōarenmei undō).

Ishiwara and Manchuria

Ishiwara was assigned to the Army Staff College as an instructor, followed by a staff position within the Kwantung Army in Manchuria. He arrived there at the end of 1928, some months after the assassination of Zhang Zuolin. Ishiwara quickly realized that the confused political situation in northern China, along with Japan's already significant economic investments in the area, provided the Kwantung Army with a unique opportunity. He and Colonel Seishiro Itagaki began formulating a plan to take advantage of the situation.

On 18 September 1931, a bomb was secretly planted on the tracks of the Japanese-controlled Southern Manchuria Railway by Kwantung Army elements. Charging that Chinese soldiers had attacked the rail line, Ishiwara ordered Japanese troops to seize the Chinese military barracks in the nearby city of Liutiaokou. He then ordered Kwantung Army units to seize control of all other Manchurian cities without informing the new commander-in-chief of the Kwantung Army, General Shigeru Honjo, or the Imperial Japanese Army General Staff in Tokyo.

The sudden invasion of Manchuria alarmed political leaders in Japan, and brought condemnation down on the country from the international community. Ishiwara thought it most likely that he would be executed or at least dishonorably discharged for his insubordination. However, the success of the operation brought just the opposite. Ishiwara was admired by right-wing younger officers and ultranationalist societies for his daring and initiative. He returned to Japan and was given command of the IJA 4th Infantry Regiment in Sendai.

Army revolutionaries
Ishiwara was appointed to the Imperial Japanese Army General Staff in 1935 as Chief of Operations, which gave him primary responsibility for articulating his vision for Japan's future. He was a strong proponent of pan-Asianism and the hokushin-ron ("strike north") philosophy, as opposed to the nanshin-ron ("strike south") philosophy espoused by the Imperial Japanese Navy (IJN). The strike north view held that Japan should join with Manchukuo (the Japanese puppet state created out of occupied Manchuria in 1932) and China to form an "East Asian League", which would then prepare for and fight a war with the Soviet Union. After the Soviet Union was defeated, Japan could move to the south to free Southeast Asia from European colonial rule. Following this victory, Japan would then be ready to tackle the United States.

However, in order to implement these plans, Japan would need to build up its economy and military. Ishiwara envisioned a one-party "national defense state" with a command economy in which political parties were abolished and venal politicians and greedy businessmen removed from power.

However, Ishiwara stopped short of calling for a Shōwa Restoration and violent overthrow of the government. When the February 26 Incident erupted in 1936, rebels assassinated a number of major politicians and government leaders and demanded a change in government in line with Ishiwara's philosophies. However, Ishiwara dashed their hopes by speaking out strongly against the rebellion and demanding proclamation of martial law. After Vice Chief of Staff Hajime Sugiyama pulled troops in from garrisons around Tokyo, Ishiwara was named Operations Officer of the Martial Law Headquarters.

Return to Manchukuo and disgrace
In March 1937 Ishiwara was promoted to major general and transferred back to Manchukuo as Vice Chief of Staff of the Kwantung Army. He discovered to his dismay that his Army colleagues had no intention of creating a new pan-Asian paradise, and were quite content to play the role of colonial occupiers. Ishiwara denounced the Kwantung Army leadership, and proposed that all officers take a pay cut. He confronted the Kwantung Army commander-in-chief, General Hideki Tojo, over his allocation of funds to an officers' wives club. After becoming an embarrassment to his seniors, he was relieved of command and reassigned to a local army base at Maizuru, on the seacoast near Kyoto.

Back in Japan, he began to analyze Soviet tactics at Nomonhan, where Japanese forces were defeated, proposing counter-strategies to be adopted by the Army. He wrote and gave public addresses, continuing to advocate an East Asia League partnership with China and Manchukuo and continuing to oppose the invasion of China. He became a lieutenant general in 1939 and was assigned command of the IJA 16th Division.

Ishiwara's political nemesis, Tōjō, now risen to the highest ranks, felt that the outspoken Ishiwara should be retired from the Army, but feared the reactions of young officers and right-wing activists. Finally, after Ishiwara publicly denounced Tōjō as an enemy of Japan who should "be arrested and executed," he was put on the retired list. Ishiwara went back to Yamagata, where he continued to write and study agriculture until the end of the war.

After World War II, the Supreme Commander of the Allied Powers called upon Ishiwara as a witness for the defense in the International Military Tribunal for the Far East. No charges were ever brought against Ishiwara himself, possibly due to his public opposition to Tōjō, the war in China, and the attack on Pearl Harbor. He displayed his old fire in front of the American prosecutor, arguing that U.S. President Harry S. Truman should be indicted for the mass bombing of Japanese civilians.

Notable works 

 1929 Sensōshi Taikan (戦争史大観), or A Large View (Overview, General Survey) of War History in English
 1940 Sekai Saishū Senron (世界最終戦論), or On World Final War (Armageddon) in English

Bibliography

Birolli, Bruno  (2012), "Ishiwara, l'homme qui déclencha la guerre", ARTE éditions/Armand Colin.
Godart, G. Clinton (2015), Nichirenism, Utopianism, and Modernity: Rethinking Ishiwara Kanji's East Asia League Movement, Japanese Journal of Religious Studies 42 (2), pp. 235–274
Iguchi, Gerald (2006), Nichirenism as Modernism: Imperialism, Fascism, and Buddhism in Modern Japan (Ph.D. Dissertation), University of California, San Diego, pp. 231–301 (Ishiwara Kanji, History as Contrapuntal harmony, and Modernity as "the Dawn that Never Comes")

External links

Notes 

Japanese generals
Japanese military personnel of World War II
Recipients of the Order of the Golden Kite
People from Yamagata Prefecture
People of Manchukuo
International Military Tribunal for the Far East
1889 births
1949 deaths
Nichiren Buddhism
Nichiren Buddhists
Pan-Asianists